Meghdad Ghobakhlou (born 23 August 1982) is an Iranian football player.

Club career

Persepolis 
He was promoted to Persepolis first team in the beginning of the 2003–04 season, and scored a tie-breaking 90+2 minute goal for Persepolis in a friendly against SK Sturm Graz.

Pas Hamedan 
Ghobakhlou dealt with a Posterior cruciate ligament injury in 2008 missing half of 2008–09 season. He was named Fair Player of the week 19 during 2008–09 season.

Saipa 
He joined Saipa in summer 2013.

Club career statistics

References 

Iranian footballers
Persepolis F.C. players
Living people
1982 births
PAS Hamedan F.C. players
Malavan players
Saipa F.C. players
Association football forwards